The Little North Line is a local railway line which runs between Hillerød and Helsingør in North Zealand north of Copenhagen, Denmark. The most important town along the route is Fredensborg, home to Fredensborg Palace, one of the Danish Royal Family's two main residences.

The railway opened in 1864 as part of the North Line between Copenhagen and Helsingør by way of Hillerød. The line now constitutes the northernmost section of the original North Line which has not been electrified to form part of Copenhagen's commuter rail network, the S-train.

The railway is owned by Hovedstadens Lokalbaner and operated by the railway company Lokaltog which runs frequent local train services between Hillerød station and Helsingør station.

History

The North Line opened in 1864 between Copenhagen and Elsinore by way of Hillerød. It was originally the main line to Elsinore before the more direct Coast Line opened in 1897. The North Line was gradually electrified to form part of Copenhagen's commuter rail network, the S-train, with electrification reaching Hillerød station in 1968. The Little North Line now constitutes the northernmost section of the original North Line which has not been converted into S-train.

Route

The line continues the North Line of the S-train network. It runs north from Hillerød station along the tracks of the Gribskov Line, before curving east towards Helsingør. The most important town along the route is Fredensborg, home to Fredensborg Palace, one of the Danish Royal Family's two main residences. The Little North Line joins the Coast Line in Snekkersten, one station before reaching Helsingør.

Operation
Trains on the Little North Line is operated by the railway company Lokaltog. Lokaltog operates a fairly intensive timetable on the Little North Line with light DMUs working a fixed 30-minute frequency most in the day time (until 19:00) and every hour in the evening.

Stations
 Hillerød
 Grønholt
 Kratbjerg
 Fredensborg
 Langerød
 Kvistgård
 Mørdrup
 Snekkersten
 Helsingør

See also
 North Line
 Lille Syd
 List of railway lines in Denmark

References

External links

 Lokaltog

Railway lines in Denmark
Railway lines opened in 1864
1864 establishments in Denmark
Rail transport in the Capital Region of Denmark